Sickboy or Sick Boy may refer to:

People
Sickboy (artist), British street artist
Sick Boy (wrestler), American retired professional wrestler
Sickboy, Belgian breakcore artist

Media
Sick Boy (album), by the Chainsmokers, 2018
"Sick Boy" (song), the title song
Sick Boy (film), a 2012 American indie horror-thriller
Simon "Sick Boy" Williamson, a fictional character in the novel Trainspotting and its film adaptation